Mehrdad Mardani (born 22 June 1992) is a professional Iranian wrestler. He won bronze medals at the 2018 Asian Games.

References

Living people
1992 births
Iranian male sport wrestlers
Wrestlers at the 2018 Asian Games
Medalists at the 2018 Asian Games
Asian Games medalists in wrestling
Asian Games bronze medalists for Iran
People from Izeh
Sportspeople from Khuzestan province
21st-century Iranian people

External links 

 Mehrdad Mardani on Instagram